Who is to blame? could refer to:

 Who is to Blame?, an 1846 novel by Alexander Herzen
 Who Is to Blame?, a 1918 film by Frank Borzage
 Who is the Guilty?, a 1925 Georgian silent film by Alexandre Tsutsunava
 Who Is To Blame?, a 2009 computer utility

See also:

 Blame